The canton of Le Collet-de-Dèze is an administrative division of the Lozère department, southern France. It was created at the French canton reorganisation which came into effect in March 2015. Its seat is in Le Collet-de-Dèze.

It consists of the following communes:

Barre-des-Cévennes
Bassurels
Cans-et-Cévennes
Cassagnas
Le Collet-de-Dèze
Fraissinet-de-Fourques
Gabriac
Moissac-Vallée-Française
Molezon
Le Pompidou
Rousses
Saint-André-de-Lancize
Sainte-Croix-Vallée-Française
Saint-Étienne-Vallée-Française
Saint-Germain-de-Calberte
Saint-Hilaire-de-Lavit
Saint-Julien-des-Points
Saint-Martin-de-Boubaux
Saint-Martin-de-Lansuscle
Saint-Michel-de-Dèze
Saint-Privat-de-Vallongue
Vebron
Ventalon-en-Cévennes

References

Cantons of Lozère